WGYY (100.3 FM) and WGYI (98.5 FM), branded as Froggy 100.3 and 98.5, are commercial radio stations in Crawford County in Northwestern Pennsylvania.  Both stations simulcast a country music radio format and are owned by Seven Mountains Media.  WGYY is licensed to Meadville, Pennsylvania.  WGYI is licensed to Oil City, Pennsylvania.

History

100.3 WGYY
WGYY signed on the air in 1948 as WMGW-FM, the first FM radio station in Crawford County.  It was founded by Meadville physician Dr. Harry C. Winslow.  Dr. Winslow chose his daughter's initials (Mary Grace Winslow) for the station's call letters.  WMGW-FM was co-owned with AM 1490 WMGW.  For the first three decades, WMGW and WMGW-FM mostly simulcast their programming.

Like many small-town radio stations, WMGW-AM-FM broadcast a full service radio format through the 1960s, 70s and 80s, consisting of local, world and national news, local and Pittsburgh sports, and adult contemporary music.  World and national news was provided by ABC News and the Associated Press radio network.

In the early 1970s, WMGW-AM-FM were purchased by the Regional Broadcasters Group headquartered in Kingston, New York.  The FM station's call letters were changed to WZPR as a tribute to Meadville's Talon Corporation which, nearly a century earlier, had become America's first manufacturer of "hookless fasteners" or zippers.  While WMGW's AM format remained the same, WZPR changed to automated beautiful music, playing quarter hour sweeps of mostly instrumental cover versions of popular songs.

In 1978 WZPR switched to its current format, country music, eventually taking the WGYY call letters.

98.5 WGYI
On May 1, 1957, WGYI signed on the air.  Its original callsign was WDJR and its effective radiated power was 3,400 watts.  It mostly simulcast its AM sister station, AM 1340 WKRZ (now 1120 kHz WKQW).  WKRZ and WDJR were owned by WKRZ, Inc. and carried programming from NBC Radio.

Sale to Seven Mountains Media
It was announced on October 12, 2022 that Forever Media is selling 34 stations, including WGYY/WGYI and the entire Meadville/Franklin cluster, to State College-based Seven Mountains Media for $17.3 million. The deal closed on January 2, 2023.

References

External links
 
 
 

GYY
Country radio stations in the United States
Radio stations established in 1978